"The Clincher" is the second single from Chevelle's third album This Type of Thinking (Could Do Us In). The song is about claustrophobia, as confirmed by Sam Loeffler. Despite this, many people still mistakenly infer that the song is the band's take on The Passion of Christ, due to lyrics like "helped to nail down" which refers to the crucifixion. The song appears on the soundtrack to the video games Madden NFL 2005 and Guitar Hero Live.

Critical reception
Loudwire ranked it the sixth greatest Chevelle song.

Charts

Certifications

References

External links
 
 [ Chevelle - Artist Chart History]

2004 songs
2005 singles
Chevelle (band) songs
Songs written by Pete Loeffler
Epic Records singles
Songs written by Sam Loeffler
Song recordings produced by Michael Baskette